The Wings is a 1916 Swedish silent film directed by Mauritz Stiller, starring Nils Asther, Egil Eide, Lars Hanson, Lili Bech, and Julius Hälsig, and was based on Herman Bang's 1902 novel Mikaël, which was the same source Carl Theodor Dreyer used for his 1924 film Michael.

Besides being an early gay-themed film, it is also notable for its innovative use of a framing story and telling the plot primarily through the use of flashbacks.

Plot
The story is that of a conniving countess (played by Lili Bech) coming between a gay sculptor, Claude Zoret (Egil Eide), and his bisexual model and lover, Mikaël (Lars Hanson), ultimately leading to Zoret's death in a raging storm at the base of a statue of Mikaël as the mythological Icarus.

Preservation status
The film is largely lost, with only half an hour surviving of the original 70-minute film. A restoration was made using still photos and title cards to bridge the missing sections in 1987.

External links

1916 films
Swedish black-and-white films
Films directed by Mauritz Stiller
Lost Swedish films
Swedish silent films
1910s Swedish-language films
Films based on Danish novels
Films based on works by Herman Bang
Swedish LGBT-related films
1910s LGBT-related films
1916 lost films